The Women's Omnium was one of the 9 women's events at the 2009 UCI Track Cycling World Championships, held in Pruszków, Poland.

This was the first time a women's omnium event had ever been included in the World Championships. 16 cyclists from 16 countries participated in the contest. The omnium consisted of five events, which were all contested on 28 March: a sprint 200 m time trial with a flying start, scratch race, 2 km individual pursuit, points race and a 500 m time trial.

The competition was won by Josephine Tomic of Australia.

Omnium event results

Sprint 200 m time trial – flying start

World Record

Result

Scratch

2 km Pursuit

Points Race
Elapsed Time=13:25.936
Average Speed=44.668 km/h

500 m time trial

World Record

Results

Overall standings

References

Women's omnium
UCI Track Cycling World Championships – Women's omnium